Rick Kolowski (born December 26, 1944) is a politician from the U.S. state of Nebraska. He represented District 31 in the Nebraska Legislature.

Kolowski earned his BA from Lake Forest College in 1966, his MS from the University of Nebraska Omaha, and his PhD from the University of Nebraska–Lincoln.

When Senator Rich Pahls retired and left the District 31 seat open, Kolowski placed first in the May 15, 2012 primary election with 3,214 votes, and won the November 6, 2012 general election with 9,121 votes against Acela Turco.

Kolowski retired from the Millard Public Schools where he served in several positions over his three decades of employment, culminating as principal of Millard West High School. Before running for the Nebraska Legislature, Kolowski served as a board member for the Learning Community of the Douglas and Sarpy Counties as well as an elected member of the Papio Missouri River Natural Resources District board.

References

External links
Official page at the Nebraska Legislature
Campaign site
 

1944 births
Living people
Lake Forest College alumni
Democratic Party Nebraska state senators
Politicians from Omaha, Nebraska
People from LaSalle, Illinois
Educators from Nebraska
University of Nebraska Omaha alumni
University of Nebraska–Lincoln alumni
21st-century American politicians